Rolled Gold: The Very Best of the Rolling Stones is a compilation album by The Rolling Stones released without the band's authorisation by its former label Decca Records in 1975. It is a double album that reached No. 7 on the UK chart and was a strong seller over the years.

Track listing

Rolled Gold+: The Very Best of the Rolling Stones (2007 edition)

In 2007, the original collection was expanded to 40 songs from the original's 28 tracks. Released in the UK on 12 November 2007, it is an expanded rerelease of the original 1975 collection which reached No. 7 on the UK chart.

The set debuted at No. 26 on the UK chart on 18 November 2007, and has sold over 125,000 copies so far according to Music Week.

The album is available in double CD, quadruple vinyl LP, and USB flash drive editions; the USB edition was the first album to be released in the UK in this format. It is also available via digital download. Cover design by Alex Trochut.

Revised track listing

Songs that are on the 2007 collection, but were not on the 1975 collection are:
"Tell Me"
"Heart of Stone"
"Play with Fire"
"I'm Free"
"Mother's Little Helper"
"Dandelion"
"2000 Light Years from Home"
"No Expectations"
"Let It Bleed"
"You Can't Always Get What You Want"
"Brown Sugar"
"Wild Horses"

Charts

Weekly charts

Year-end charts

Certifications and sales

References

External links
The Rolling Stones: Rolled Gold+ at Sleevage

1975 greatest hits albums
2007 greatest hits albums
Albums produced by Jimmy Miller
Albums produced by Andrew Loog Oldham
Albums produced by Mick Jagger
The Rolling Stones compilation albums
Decca Records compilation albums